The Nice Guys is a 2016 American neo-noir buddy action comedy film directed and co-written (alongside Anthony Bagarozzi) by Shane Black, produced by Joel Silver, and starring Russell Crowe and Ryan Gosling in the title roles with Angourie Rice, Matt Bomer, Margaret Qualley, Keith David and Kim Basinger in supporting roles. Set in 1977 Los Angeles, the film focuses on private eye Holland March (Gosling) and tough enforcer for hire Jackson Healy (Crowe) who team up to investigate the disappearance of a teenage girl (Qualley).

The Nice Guys premiered on May 11, 2016, in Hollywood, screened on May 15 at the 2016 Cannes Film Festival, and was released by Warner Bros. Pictures in the United States on May 20, 2016. It received positive reviews from critics for its humor, mystery, and the performances of Crowe and Gosling. It grossed $62 million on a $50 million budget.

Plot 
In 1977 Los Angeles, down-on-his-luck private eye Holland March is hired by porn star Misty Mountain's aunt, Mrs. Glenn, who claims to have seen Misty still alive after her death. March's investigation leads him to Amelia Kuttner, an associate of Misty who pays violent enforcer Jackson Healy to scare March away.

Healy is interrogated by two thugs, "Blueface" — so named after he sets off a dye pack while searching Healy's apartment — and Older Guy, about Amelia. Healy wards them off with a shotgun and teams up with a reluctant March to find Amelia first.

March and Healy question Amelia's anti-pollution protest group and meet Chet, who brings them to the burnt-down house of Amelia's boyfriend Dean, who died in the fire. They learn that Amelia and Dean were working with Misty on an "experimental film" — combining pornography and investigative journalism.

The two infiltrate a party in search of the film's financier, Sid Shattuck. Healy discovers the film is missing, while March drunkenly finds Shattuck dead and unknowingly crosses paths with Amelia. March's daughter Holly, having snuck along to the party, stops Blueface from killing Amelia. Blueface is struck in a hit-and-run, and Amelia flees. Healy subdues Older Guy and finds Blueface dying. Blueface tells Healy his boss has dispatched a hit man named John Boy to kill all witnesses. Healy discreetly kills Blueface. The police arrive at the scene, and March and Healy are met by Amelia's mother, Judith Kuttner, a high-ranking official in the Justice Department, who claims Amelia is delusional. Judith hires the duo to find her daughter.

March and Healy go to an airport hotel where Amelia is meeting with distributors for the film. John Boy has arrived ahead of them; they witness the businessmen being slaughtered and hastily retreat, only for Amelia to land on their car, shoot at them, and knock herself unconscious. They take her to March's house, where she accuses her mother of colluding with car makers to suppress the catalytic converter, which regulates exhaust emissions. Amelia created the film to expose their collusion and believes her mother has had everyone connected to the film killed.

March tells Judith's assistant Tally that Amelia has been found and is at March's house. Tally tells them that Judith has requested they deliver a briefcase of $100,000 to Judith and informs them the family's doctor will go to March's house to check on Amelia. When March crashes the car, the briefcase flies open to reveal shredded magazines; the delivery was a diversion to leave Amelia unprotected. John Boy arrives at March's house disguised as the family doctor, attacks Holly and her friend Jessica, and engages in a shootout with March and Healy. As John Boy evades the police, Amelia flees the house and unwittingly flags down his car, only to be killed.

The police question and release March and Healy, who have no evidence that Judith is behind the murders. March realizes that Mrs. Glenn saw Misty in a film projected against a wall. At Misty's house, they discover a film projector, but the film is missing. They realize that Chet is the projectionist for the Los Angeles Auto Show and will try to screen the film at the event. At the auto show, Tally intercepts Healy and March at gunpoint. Holly distracts Tally, who is knocked unconscious. Amelia's film, which Chet spliced into the auto show presentation, implicates the auto executives. On the rooftop March struggles with Older Guy, who falls to his death as March lands in the pool after both fell from the roof. Holly stops Tally from reaching the film. Healy overpowers John Boy but spares his life at Holly's ultimatum, and March secures the film from thugs sent by the auto executives.

Judith is arrested but insists that it was Detroit who wanted Amelia dead; she hired March and Healy to keep Amelia safe. Judith remarks that while she will go to jail, Detroit has still gotten away with trying to suppress the catalytic converter. Later, at a bar on Christmas Eve, March shows Healy an advertisement for their new detective agency called "The Nice Guys".

Cast 

 Russell Crowe as Jackson Healy
 Ryan Gosling as Holland March 
 Angourie Rice as Holly March
 Matt Bomer as John Boy / Dr. Malek
 Margaret Qualley as Amelia Kuttner
 Yaya DaCosta as Tally
 Keith David as Eddie Harris, Older Guy
 Beau Knapp as Blueface
 Lois Smith as Mrs. Glenn
 Murielle Telio as Misty Mountains
 Gil Gerard as Bergen Paulsen
 Daisy Tahan as Jessica
 Jack Kilmer as Chet
 Kim Basinger as Judith Kuttner
 Lance Valentine Butler as Kid On Bike
 Ty Simpkins as Bobby 
 Hannibal Buress as Bumble
 Robert Downey Jr. as Sid Shattuck (uncredited)

Production

Development
Like Black's previously directed film Kiss Kiss Bang Bang, The Nice Guys takes inspiration from Brett Halliday, namely his novel Blue Murder. Black initially wrote a version of the script along with Anthony Bagarozzi in 2001 which established the characters but otherwise was vastly different. According to Black, each would start with one detective, he with March and Bagarozzi with Healy. Along the way, they swapped characters and eventually wrote a first draft. This version of the script failed to attract any buyers, and then Black reworked it into a 64-page version that would serve for a television pilot. CBS became attracted to it, but given the contents led to many objections by the Standards and Practices department, it eventually did not progress. Black would later, upon promoting the release of the final film, speak disparagingly of the idea of the television series, stating that such a show "wouldn't have been any good". By 2009, Bagarozzi suggested changing the film from a contemporary setting to the 1970s. Black's producer friend Joel Silver was initially wary of the idea as he felt audiences would not be as welcoming to a period piece, but he changed his mind after producing Sherlock Holmes. Black stated the change in time period helped as in contrast to "the divisiveness that we see now", the 1970s was full of multiculturalism and "was the aftermath of the protests and you got a sense that we are all in it together". The contents also drew from films of the period such as Vanishing Point and Five Easy Pieces. Bagarozzi noted how the title The Nice Guys aimed to be ironic and non-descriptive, as the two main characters were "literally the two worst people that we could think of and then trying to make that fun," given "one breaks arms for a living and the other cons old ladies out of money."

Casting
After Shane Black completed Iron Man 3 in 2013, Silver asked Black what he wanted to do next, and he expressed interest in doing The Nice Guys. The scripts were sent to Ryan Gosling and Russell Crowe, and both wound up taking the roles specially for the prospect of working with one another. Gosling even stated that when he read the script already picturing Crowe as Healy, "the movie just immediately became so funny" as he had never seen Crowe in a similar role. Gosling and Crowe accepted in a period of three days, and Black cited the casting as the reason the film was able to move forward, summed up as "After thirteen years it just popped into place in three days". The film was announced in June 2014, and other casting news followed with Margaret Qualley and Angourie Rice officially joining in September. Matt Bomer, Keith David, Beau Knapp, and Kim Basinger were confirmed in October, and Ty Simpkins and Jack Kilmer were announced in November.

Filming
Principal photography began on October 27, 2014, in Atlanta and Decatur, Georgia. While production designer Richard Bridgland saw a challenge in that the green Atlanta differed too much from desertic Los Angeles, he found some fitting locations such as Dallas Austin's house, whose design was based on what architect John Lautner found in Southern California, and the Atlanta Hilton, which had not changed at all since being built in 1976. On October 31, a police station scene was filmed in Atlanta among extras. Filming also took place in Los Angeles, mostly to get exteriors of locations such as The Comedy Store.

Bridgland did his best to recreate the 1970s, researching from Super 8 films to documentary photographs, and basing the furniture on designers such as Verner Panton. Even the Misty Mountains glamour photography had Bridgland recruiting Arny Freytag, responsible for most Playboy centerfolds of the decade. For its part, Warner Bros. used its 1972–84 title featuring the "Big W" logo designed by Saul Bass for Warner Communications to open the film.

Music 
John Ottman, who had scored Shane Black's Kiss Kiss Bang Bang, was brought to do the music for The Nice Guys along with David Buckley. Ottman drew inspiration from 1970s shows such as S.W.A.T. and The Dean Martin Show, with The Streets of San Francisco being a particular influence on the main theme. Ottman detailed that the difference to Kiss Kiss Bang Bang was that now the music was more song-driven, with Black stating that the songs would contrast to the neo-noir tone by focusing on mainstream, exuberant songs of the decade.

Lakeshore Records issued soundtrack albums for both the featured music and original score. The soundtrack also got a special collector's edition vinyl designed by Los Angeles-based creative services company iam8bit to create "something that seemed like it was an artifact from the seventies" and also "drew from the fictional world of the movie and give you something tactile you can hold in your hand", with the gatefold being a 3D centerfold of Misty Mountains, and the packaging including posters of Sid Shattuck films and a business card for The Nice Guys Agency.

Release 
In the United States, the film was originally scheduled for a June 17, 2016 release, which Warner Bros. moved up to May 20, 2016, giving its previous date to Central Intelligence. The film had its premiere at the TCL Chinese Theatre in Hollywood on May 11, followed by a 1970s-themed after-party at The Hollywood Roosevelt Hotel, and screened at Cannes on May 15.

The film was released on digital on August 9, 2016, and DVD and Blu-ray on August 23, 2016.

Reception

Box office 
The Nice Guys grossed $36.3 million in the United States and Canada, and $25.5 million in other countries, for a worldwide total of $62.8 million, against a production budget of $50 million.

In the United States and Canada, the film was released alongside Neighbors 2: Sorority Rising and The Angry Birds Movie, and was projected to gross around $10 million from 2,865 theaters in its opening weekend. It grossed $3.9 million on its first day, including $700,000 from Thursday night previews. In its opening weekend the film grossed $11.3 million, finishing fourth at the box office behind The Angry Birds Movie ($39 million), Captain America: Civil War ($33.1 million) and Neighbors 2 ($21.8 million). Phil Walden of Forbes argued that the film could have performed higher if not for sharing its release with Neighbors 2, which shared the same older demographic the film targeted. The film made $6.5 million in its second weekend (including $8.4 million over the four-day Memorial Day weekend), finishing seventh.

Critical response 
On review aggregator Rotten Tomatoes, the film holds an approval rating of 91% based on 322 reviews and an average score of 7.60/10. The website's critical consensus reads, "The Nice Guys hearkens back to the buddy comedies of a bygone era while adding something extra, courtesy of a knowing script, and the irresistible chemistry of its leads." On Metacritic, the film has a weighted average score of 70 out of 100, based on 51 critics, indicating "generally favorable reviews". Audiences polled by CinemaScore gave the film an average grade of "B−" on an A+ to F scale, while PostTrak reported filmgoers gave it a 75% overall positive score and a 52% "definite recommend".

Mike Ryan of Uproxx praised Black's writing and said: "If you like Shane Black, you will like The Nice Guys. It's probably the Shane Black-est of all the Shane Black movies. Black has a knack for turning action movie expectations on their head mixed with knowing and rich dialogue." IGN gave the film a 9/10, writing, "Working from a tight and sharp script that perfectly balances the characters like a yin and yang of screw-ups ensures The Nice Guys is an absolute joy every step of the way." Richard Roeper of Chicago Sun-Times gave 3 stars out 4 and wrote, "Forget about Kevin Hart and Ice Cube in Ride Along 2, or Zac Efron and Robert De Niro in Dirty Grandpa, or Ben Stiller and Owen Wilson in Zoolander 2. Russell Crowe and Ryan Gosling are the funniest duo of the year so far in The Nice Guys". James Berardinelli described the film as reminiscent of Boogie Nights. Berardinelli wrote, "The Nice Guys is a refreshingly adult movie entering a marketplace saturated by teen-friendly superhero flicks and animated family fare. It's edgy (although not so edgy that it will turn off a mass market audience), funny, and fast-paced", and he gave a score of 3 out of 4.

A. O. Scott of The New York Times wrote that the film lacks the wistful, slyly political sense of history found in Paul Thomas Anderson's Inherent Vice, also a quirky private investigator comedy set in the 1970s. Scott wrote, "Even nostalgic nonsense requires more than attitude and energy, which is all that Mr. Black has to offer. And despite all its restless detective work, The Nice Guys is unable to track down a soul or a reason for being." Todd McCarthy of The Hollywood Reporter wrote, "That the film mostly falls flat has far more to do with the largely unconvincing material rather than with the co-stars, who are more than game for the often clownish shenanigans Black and his co-writer Anthony Bagarozzi have concocted for them; in fit and starts, the actors display a buoyant comic rapport." McCarthy, however, praised the production design (by Richard Bridgland) and costume design (by Kym Barrett) due to their "vivid reminders of how much L.A. has spruced itself up over the past 40 years"; and the cinematography (by Philippe Rousselot) due to "the figurative and possibly even literal use of a smog filter to evoke a physically and morally toxic environment."

Accolades

Future 
In May 2016, prior to the film's release, Black said of a follow-up, "I think it's a little premature to consider a sequel. I don't believe in jinxes necessarily, but we really need people to see this one before we can even talk about that. We're up against some stiff superhero competition and we just need people to, you know, maybe see Captain America six times, but not the seventh and see us instead." In August 2018, Black reiterated his desire to make a sequel, although noted the film probably did not gross enough at the box office to make it likely.

In September 2017, Fox gave a script commitment to a contemporary female-led television version titled The Nice Girls, to be produced by Silver Pictures Television written by Michael Diliberti.

References

External links 
 
 
 

2016 films
2016 action comedy films
2016 black comedy films
2010s buddy comedy films
2010s crime comedy films
American action comedy films
American black comedy films
American buddy comedy films
American buddy action films
American crime comedy films
American detective films
2010s English-language films
Films scored by John Ottman
Films scored by David Buckley
Films about alcoholism
Films about missing people
Films about pornography
Films directed by Shane Black
Films produced by Joel Silver
Films set in 1977
Films set in Los Angeles
Films shot in Atlanta
Films shot in Los Angeles
Films with screenplays by Shane Black
American neo-noir films
Icon Productions films
Silver Pictures films
Warner Bros. films
Films set in the 1970s
2010s American films